Ramesh Dewan (born 1 December 1938) is an Indian former cricketer. He played for several domestic first-class cricket teams in India between 1958 and 1974.

See also
 List of Delhi cricketers

References

External links
 

1938 births
Living people
Indian cricketers
Delhi cricketers
Services cricketers
Vidarbha cricketers
Cricketers from Khanewal